Oleksandr Palyanytsya (born 29 February 1972) is a Ukrainian former footballer.

External links

 

1973 births
Living people
Footballers from Zhytomyr
Soviet footballers
Ukrainian footballers
Ukraine international footballers
Ukrainian expatriate footballers
Expatriate footballers in Austria
Ukrainian Premier League players
FC Kryvbas Kryvyi Rih players
NK Veres Rivne players
FC Dnipro players
FC Karpaty Lviv players
FC Metalist Kharkiv players
Ukrainian Cup top scorers
Association football forwards
Sportspeople from Zhytomyr Oblast